Burst may refer to:
Burst mode (disambiguation), a mode of operation where events occur in rapid succession
Burst transmission, a term in telecommunications
Burst switching, a feature of some packet-switched networks
Bursting, a signaling mode of neurons
Burst phase, a feature of the PAL television format
Burst fracture, a type of spinal injury
Burst charge, a component of some fireworks
Burst noise, type of electronic noise that occurs in semiconductors
Burst (coin), a cryptocurrency
Burst finish, a two- or three-color faded effect applied to musical instruments e.g. sunburst (finish)
Burst (village), a village in Erpe-Mere
Burst.com, a software company
Burst Radio, the University of Bristol student radio station
Burst (band), a Swedish progressive metal band
Burst (Burst EP)
Burst (UP10TION EP)
 "Burst", a song by Anthrax from Sound of White Noise